Marcos Fink (born 26 November 1950, in Buenos Aires, Argentina) is a Slovenian singer of classical music. He was a member of various vocal groups in Argentina, and began his solo singing career in 1985. He was educated by many European maestros: Wolfgang Schöne (Bach Academy Stuttgart), Philippe Huttenlocher, Aldo Baldin, Eric Werba, and Guillermo Opitz.

His sister is Bernarda Fink, also a classical music singer.

References

External links
  Marcos Fink's Biography
  Marcos Fink's Home page

1950 births
Living people
Argentine expatriates in Slovenia
Argentine people of Slovenian descent
Argentine baritones